Alec Lazenby  (born 1927) is an academic who has held positions at the University of Cambridge, University of New England, University of Tasmania, the Institute of Grassland and Environmental Research and the Welsh Plant Breeding Station. Lazenby served as the Vice-Chancellor of the University of New England from 1970 to 1977, and the University of Tasmania from 1982 to 1991.

Early life and career
Lazenby was born in Yorkshire and attended Wath Grammar School before graduating from the University of Cambridge and both lectured and demonstrated there before moving to Armidale, New South Wales, Australia.

University of New England
Lazenby was appointed the foundation Professor of Agronomy and head of the Department of Agronomy in February 1965 before being appointed the university's third Vice-Chancellor in 1970. He was appointed an emeritus professor when his term as Vice-Chancellor ended in 1977. During his time as Vice-Chancellor, Lazenby lived in the Vice-Chancellor's official residence "Trevenna".

In 1971, he strongly supported an amalgamation of the University of New England and the Armidale Teachers' College. In June 1971 he asked the Academic Planning Committee to comment on the possible amalgamation because he believed "Armidale was too small for two independent tertiary institutions." However the suggested amalgamation was opposed by the staff of both institutions and was eventually overturned by the Hawke Government when it took office in 1983.

Institute of Grassland and Environmental Research
Lazenby moved back to the UK in 1977 and took up a position as the Director of the Institute of Grassland and Environmental Research.

Return to Australia
Lazenby returned to Australia in early 1982 and was appointed the Vice-Chancellor of the University of Tasmania on 21 October 1982 replacing David Caro. He held the position until 1991. He was replaced as the Vice-Chancellor at beginning of February 1991 by Alan Gilbert.

In 1985 then Federal Minister for Primary Industry John Kerin asked him to investigate the introduction of plant breeders' rights legislation, which was enacted in 1987.

Honours and recognition
Lazenby was made an Officer of the Order of Australia in the 1988 New Year's Day Honours; the citation was "for service to learning". Lazenby also received the Centenary Medal in the 2001 New Year's Honours "for service to Australian society in rural science and technology".

Bibliography
Lazenby has written and co-written a number of books on the topics such as agriculture and agronomy. The following bibliography contains some of Lazenby's writings:

References

External links
Alec Lazenby in the WorldCat catalog
Alec Lazenby in the Trove catalogue

1927 births
Academic staff of the University of New England (Australia)
Academic staff of the University of Tasmania
Alumni of the University of Cambridge
People educated at Wath Academy
Living people
Officers of the Order of Australia
Recipients of the Centenary Medal
English emigrants to Australia
Fellows of the Australian Academy of Technological Sciences and Engineering